István Szőts (June 30, 1912 – November 6, 1998) was a Hungarian screenwriter and film director. He was born in Szentgyörgyválya (now Valea Sângeorgiului, Călan, Romania), and later moved with his father to Hungary. Szőts studied fine arts at the painting school of the two masters, Aba-Novák Vilmos and Iványi-Grünwald Béla. In 1939 he worked at Hunnia, where he was assistant to director Lajos Zilahy.

Activity 
He is best known for his 1942 film People of the Mountains which won first prize at the Venice Biennale. Szőts became an assistant director in 1940, and in 1942 made his first feature film People of the Mountains. Although widely acclaimed by critics, it was disapproved of by Hungary's ruling wartime government and Szőts had trouble securing backing for his future projects. It wasn't until 1947 that he was able to make his second feature film Song of the Cornfields.

Selected filmography
 People of the Mountains (1942)
 Song of the Cornfields (1947)
 Melyiket a kilenc közül? (1956)

References

Bibliography
 Burns, Bryan. World Cinema: Hungary. Fairleigh Dickinson University Press, 1996.
 Kindem, Gorham Anders. The International Movie Industry. SIU Press, 2000.

External links

1912 births
1998 deaths
People from Călan
Male screenwriters
Hungarian male writers
Hungarian film directors
20th-century Hungarian screenwriters
Burials at Farkasréti Cemetery